In Ghost Colours is the second studio album by Australian electronic music band Cut Copy, released on 22 March 2008 by Modular Recordings. It comprises 15 tracks, including a re-recorded version of the single "Hearts on Fire". The album was originally planned as an Australian release for 2007, but was delayed until 2008 to accommodate a simultaneous international release of the recording.

At the J Awards of 2008, the album was nominated for Australian Album of the Year.

The album was produced in New York by Tim Goldsworthy, although the band's US label Interscope initially suggested they work with Timbaland. As of June 2008, the album had sold 24,000 copies in the United States, according to Nielsen SoundScan.

Structure and style
The album's sound has been mostly noticed for its positive, uptempo melodies, and its juxtaposition of numerous styles. The Australian website FasterLouder called In Ghost Colours "an album that draws together the sweaty live energy of an indie rock gig with the synths and bleeps of house and electronica, along with the ever-present 80s influence and now, even a dash of 60s psychedelia thrown in for good measure." The lead vocalist, Dan Whitford, said that the sound of In Ghost Colours is the closest the band has come to the sound they are after: The album is a lot more realised than the first one. I think all of us, when we think of the first one, we agree we sort of got half way there. But on the new one we got a lot closer to the sort of sounds we're after. There are some different aspects to it – more layered, more dynamic, as well as some more loud, dance-y sections to it. And with the guitar there were many-layered sections as well. It got the real highs and lows, the real floaty bits, which I think is sort of a secret to our sound, with a lot of segues so that it just sort of flows together. And I think it's a lot more, kind of... complete.

Pitchfork review said, "If the pastichey Bright Like Neon Love felt more like an opportunistic patchwork quilt of other people's sounds and ideas, the hugely enjoyable In Ghost Colours feels light, confident, and unencumbered by the dictates of fashion."

Release and reception

In Ghost Colours was released in Australia on 22 March 2008, in the United Kingdom on 5 May 2008 and in the United States on 8 April 2008. It was the band's first entry into the Australian ARIA Albums Chart, reaching number one on 30 March 2008, and the band's first entry on the Billboard 200, where it debuted at number 167.

In Ghost Colours receives generally positive reviews from music critics. At Metacritic, which assigns a normalised rating out of 100 to reviews from mainstream critics, the album has received an average score of 79, based on 17 reviews. K. Ross Hoffman at AllMusic praised the album, writing, "To be sure, In Ghost Colours is a triumph of craftsmanship rather than vision – a synthesis and refinement of existing sounds rather than anything dramatically new and original – but it is an unalloyed triumph nonetheless, and one of the finest albums of its kind." Mark Pytlik of Pitchfork found In Ghost Colours enjoyable and praised the album's cheerfulness, calling it "a hard record not to love" and assigning it a "Best New Music" designation. Pitchfork later named it the fourth best record of 2008.

Robert Christgau gave In Ghost Colours a two-star honourable mention rating, indicating a "likable effort consumers attuned to its overriding aesthetic or individual vision may well enjoy", and cited "Out There on the Ice" and "Hearts on Fire" as highlights. In a less positive review, Dave Hughes of Slant Magazine criticised the album for being unfocused. Youyoung Lee of Entertainment Weekly called the album "uneven", writing that "for every pump-your-fist gem like 'Hearts on Fire,' there's a lifeless cut like the clanky 'Silver Thoughts,' which feels like a sonic hangover."

Accolades

Track listing

Personnel
Credits adapted from the liner notes of In Ghost Colours.

 Cut Copy – production
 Tim Goldsworthy – production, mixing
 Eric Broucek – production assistance
 John Fields – production assistance, mixing 
 Atom – mixing assistance 
 Dan Whitford – additional mixing
 Tim Hoey – additional mixing
 Warwick Baker – cover concept, art direction, layout

Charts

Weekly charts

Year-end charts

Certifications

References

2008 albums
Albums produced by Guy Sigsworth
Cut Copy albums
Modular Recordings albums